Zhuozhou or Zhuo Prefecture was a zhou (prefecture) in imperial China in modern Zhuozhou, Hebei, China. It existed (intermittently) from 769 to 1913. It was one of the Sixteen Prefectures.

The modern city of Zhuozhou, created in 1986, retains its name.

Geography
The administrative region of Zhuo Prefecture in Later Zhou is in modern central Hebei. It probably includes parts of modern: 
Under the administration of Baoding:
Zhuozhou
Xiong County
Under the administration of Langfang:
Gu'an County

References
 

Prefectures of the Jin dynasty (1115–1234)
Prefectures of the Liao dynasty
Prefectures of the Yuan dynasty
Subprefectures of the Ming dynasty
Departments of the Qing dynasty
Prefectures of Later Tang
Former prefectures in Hebei